Peltorhamphus tenuis is a righteye flounder of the family Pleuronectidae, found only around New Zealand in enclosed waters less than 100 m in depth.

References
 
 Tony Ayling & Geoffrey Cox, Collins Guide to the Sea Fishes of New Zealand,  (William Collins Publishers Ltd, Auckland, New Zealand 1982) 

Pleuronectidae
Endemic marine fish of New Zealand
Fish described in 1972